Teplyy Klyuch (Sılaas Külüüs) is a rural locality (a selo), the administrative centre of and one of three settlements, in addition to Aeroport and Razbilka, in Teploklyuchevsky Rural Okrug of Tomponsky District in the Sakha Republic, Russia. Its population as of the 2002 Census was 596.

References

Notes

Sources
Official website of the Sakha Republic. Registry of the Administrative-Territorial Divisions of the Sakha Republic. Tomponsky District. 

Rural localities in Tomponsky District